Murashi is the name of several inhabited localities in Russia.

Urban localities
Murashi, Kirov Oblast, a town in Murashinsky District of Kirov Oblast; 

Rural localities
Murashi, Novosibirsk Oblast, a selo in Ust-Tarksky District of Novosibirsk Oblast
Murashi, Perm Krai, a village in Permsky District of Perm Krai